Violent Cop is 2000 Hong Kong action film directed by Steve Cheng and starring Anthony Wong, Michael Wong and Wayne Lai.

Plot
A cop teams up with a pimp to catch a killer who castrates his male victims.

Cast
 Anthony Wong as Tai Pan-kim
 Michael Wong as Inspector Cuba Koo
 Wayne Lai as Tse Chun-mao
 Astrid Chan as Koo's Wife
 Iris Chai as Cee
 Moses Chan as Yuen Wai-hau
 Thomas Sin as Killer
 William Ho as Brother Scar
 Lo Hung as Chun-mao's father
 Chung Yeung
 Ngo Wai-kong as Officer Tsang
 Ankee Leung as Friend of Cuba
 Thomas Hudak as Priest
 Leung Ka-po as Delivery man
 Wong Chi-man

External links
 
 HK Cinemagic entry
 lovehkfilm entry

2000 films
2000 action thriller films
2000 crime thriller films
Hong Kong action thriller films
Hong Kong crime thriller films
Police detective films
2000s Cantonese-language films
Films set in Hong Kong
Films shot in Hong Kong
2000s Hong Kong films